Flask may refer to:

Container 

 Hip flask, a small container used to carry a small amount of liquid
 Laboratory flask, laboratory glassware for holding larger volumes than simple test tubes
 Erlenmeyer flask, a common laboratory flask with a flat bottom, a conical body, and a cylindrical neck
 Vacuum flask, a container designed to keep warm drinks warm and refrigerated drinks cold

Other
 Flask (metal casting), a containing frame without a top or bottom, with sides only, used to hold molding sand
 Flask (web framework), a web framework for the Python programming language
 Powder flask, a small container for gunpowder
 FLASK, the Flux Advanced Security Kernel, an operating system security architecture
 Flask (unit), a unit used in UK avoirdupois weight to measure the element mercury
 The Flask, Hampstead, a Grade II listed public house at 14 Flask Walk, Hampstead, London
 The Flask, Highgate, a Grade II listed public house at 74–76 Highgate West Hill, Highgate, London

See also
 
 
 Lagena (disambiguation), a word derived from the Greek meaning flask